The 2016 election of members to the Senate of the Philippines was the 32nd election of members to the Senate of the Philippines. The seats of 12 senators elected in 2010 were filled during this election. The winners in this election joined the winners of the 2013 election to form the 17th Congress of the Philippines. The senators elected in 2013 served until June 30, 2019, while the senators elected in this election would serve up to June 30, 2022.

The Senate election was part of the 2016 general election where elections for the president of the Philippines, vice president, members of the Philippine House of Representatives, and all local officials, including those from the Autonomous Region in Muslim Mindanao, were held.

The Senate election used a plurality-at-large voting system where the voter votes for 12 candidates, with each candidate getting one vote, and from which the twelve candidates with the highest number of votes are elected to serve for six years.

Electoral system

Philippine senatorial elections are done via the plurality-at-large voting system: the entire country is one at-large "district", where a voter can vote up to twelve people (one vote per candidate), with the twelve candidates with the highest number of votes deemed elected. Senators who are currently serving their second consecutive term are term limited, although they may run again in 2019. Only half of the seats are up in every senatorial election. The winning senators replaced the batch elected in 2010, and joined the batch elected in 2013 in the 17th Congress.

Each party has a slate of as many candidates as it desires, although parties don't usually exceed a 12-person ticket. A party may also choose to invite "guest candidates" to complete its slate. The party may even include, with the candidates' consent, independent candidates and candidates from other parties as the party's guest candidates. A coalition of different parties may also be formed.

In general elections where senators and presidents are elected at the same time, the presidential candidates often have their own slates of senatorial candidates. This means voters have more choices unlike in midterm elections, when there are usually only two major contending political forces.

Winning candidates are proclaimed by the Commission on Elections (COMELEC) sitting as the National Board of Canvassers. Candidates are proclaimed senators-elect if the thirteenth-place candidate no longer has a mathematical chance of surpassing the twelfth-place candidate. Post-proclamation disputes are handled by the Senate Electoral Tribunal, a body composed of six senators and three justices from the Supreme Court.

Coalitions
A coalition led by the Liberal Party (LP) of Interior and Local Government Secretary Mar Roxas, the successor of the administration-backed Team PNoy coalition In 2013, and the primary opposition United Nationalist Alliance of Vice President Jejomar Binay, put up senatorial slates. Aside from these coalitions, candidates running for president also put up their own opposition slates. Some candidates are included in more than one coalitions.

Koalisyon ng Daang Matuwid
The senatorial ticket of the Liberal Party called as "Koalisyon ng Daang Matuwid" (Coalition for the Straight Path), was unveiled last October 12, 2015 at the LP's headquarters in Cubao, Quezon City led by President Aquino III, and the Roxas and Robredo tandem.

In a resolution passed September 30, 2015, the LP National Directorate, and LP National Executive Council nominated incumbent senators Franklin Drilon, TG Guingona and Ralph Recto, former Department of Justice (DOJ) secretary Leila de Lima and former senator Francis Pangilinan for inclusion. LP Standard-bearer Mar Roxas also declared former Energy Secretary and former Leyte governor Jericho Petilla (LP) as part of the slate. On October 12, 2015, Interior and Local Government Assistant Secretary for Muslim Affairs and Special Concerns Ina Ambolodto, PhilHealth Board Director Risa Hontiveros, COOP-NATCCO Party List Representative Cresente Paez and Technical Education and Skills Development Authority Director General Joel Villanueva were included in the slate.

Partido Galing at Puso
The senatorial slate of Grace Poe, known as "Partido Galing at Puso," included independents and candidates from other political parties. The coalition line up was unveiled for the first time after the last day of filing on October 16, 2015. It included Manila vice mayor Isko Moreno, congressman Win Gatchalian, worker advocate Susan Ople, incumbent senator Tito Sotto, Bayan Muna congressman Neri Colmenares, actor Edu Manzano, lawyer Lorna Kapunan, party-list congressman Samuel Pagdilao, former senator Juan Miguel Zubiri, and Richard J. Gordon, congressman Roman Romulo, On October 29, 2015 the senatorial coalition line up was unveiled at Club Filipino.

Term-limited and retiring incumbents

Term limited
The following are barred from seeking reelection, although they can be elected anew in 2019:

Pia Cayetano (NP)
Won the election for House representative from Taguig's 2nd district. Cayetano ran for senator in 2019 and won.
Miriam Defensor Santiago (PRP)
Ran for president and lost. Santiago subsequently died in September 2016.
 Juan Ponce Enrile (UNA)
In December 2013, Enrile said he would retire from politics, denying reports he would run for governor of Cagayan province.  Enrile ran for senator in 2019 and lost.
 Jinggoy Estrada (UNA)
In detention due to corruption charges and his alleged involvement in the Priority Development Assistance Fund scam, Estrada told reporters that after his August 2014 bail hearing he would "run in 2016 for a higher office" and that he would be Vice President Jejomar Binay's running mate. However, this did not materialize, with Gregorio Honasan finally chosen by his party 's running to be Binay's running mate. Estrada ran for senator in 2019 and lost. Estrada ran again for senator in 2022 and won.
 Lito Lapid (Independent)
In January 2015, Lapid announced that he would run for mayor of Angeles City. Lapid eventually lost. Lapid ran for senator in 2019 and won.
 Bong Revilla (Lakas)
In detention due to corruption charges and his alleged involvement in the Priority Development Assistance Fund scam, Revilla expressed that he was considering a 2016 presidential campaign and a return to show business. However, this did not materialize. Revilla ran for senator in 2019 and won.

Other incumbent senators may seek other political offices in 2016.

Retiring incumbents
The following senators' terms are ending in 2016, are eligible to run, but targeted other positions:
Bongbong Marcos (Independent)
Ran for vice president as Miriam Defensor Santiago's (PRP) running mate and lost.

Running for another office mid-term
The following senators' terms ended in 2019. They could run for other positions, but could return to the Senate if they lose; have they won, they were expected to forfeit their Senate seats once the terms of their new position started:
Alan Peter Cayetano (Independent)
Ran for vice president as Rodrigo Duterte's (PDP–Laban) running mate and lost.
Francis Escudero (Independent)
Ran for vice president as Grace Poe's (independent) running mate and lost.
Gregorio Honasan (UNA)
Ran for vice president as Jejomar Binay's (UNA) running mate and lost.
Grace Poe (Independent)
Ran for president and lost.
Antonio Trillanes (Independent)
Running for vice president with no running mate but is supporting Grace Poe's candidacy, and lost.

None of the candidates whose terms ended in 2019 won, thereby giving the Senate a full 24-person membership at the start of the next Congress.

Cayetano is a member of the Nacionalista Party, so were Marcos and Trillanes, but all did not win that party's nomination to run as vice president. Instead, they were running as independents in the vice presidential election. Cayetano and Trillanes were expected to return to the Senate as Nacionalistas once the Senate opened its session for the 17th Congress.

Campaign
In March 2015, Walden Bello resigned his position in Congress and from the Akbayan party, which is allied with President Benigno Aquino III, due to conflicts with Aquino that surrounded the Disbursement Acceleration Program and the Mamasapano incident. As a result of the Mamasapano clash, Getulio Napeñas was relieved from his position and later retired.

On May 20, 2015, the Office of the Ombudsman dismissed the complaint filed by former Iloilo provincial administrator Manuel Mejorada against Senator Franklin Drilon, DPWH Secretary Rogelio Singson, DOT Secretary Ramon Jimenez Jr., and other officials involved in the construction of the Iloilo Convention Center. On August 7, 2015, Senator Gringo Honasan, former CIBAC congressman and now TESDA chair Joel Villanueva, and seven other former and incumbent lawmakers were charged before the Office of the Ombudsman in connection with the pork barrel scam.

In August 2015, Leila de Lima assisted Isaias Samson, an expelled minister of Iglesia ni Cristo (INC), in filing a case against the sect. Members protested at the DOJ office the next day while others occupied EDSA in Mandaluyong a few days later to urge de Lima to resign, and give focus to the Mamasapano clash where two members of the INC were killed. On September 15, 2015, Francis Pangilinan announced his resignation from the cabinet of President Benigno Aquino III. On September 29, 2015, Francis Tolentino spoke in Cavite for his intention to run for the Senate under Aquino's Liberal Party. However, controversy surrounding a lewd performance in a political rally in Santa Cruz, Laguna forced him to resign from the party.

Grace Poe and Francis Escudero revealed that eight candidates were named on the initial list of their senatorial slate. On September 30, 2015, Poe endorsed Bayan Muna representative Neri Colmenares. On October 12, 2015, the Liberal Party announced its complete senatorial line-up in Quezon City under the Koalisyon ng Daang Matuwid. The United Nationalist Alliance completed their slate on October 21, 2015. Panfilo Lacson accused Poe of favoring actor Edu Manzano over himself on October 27, 2015 when it was reported that Manzano was joining the Senate slate of Poe. On October 29, 2015, Poe and Escudero announced in an event held in Club Filipino, San Juan, the complete senatorial slate for the Partido Galing at Puso coalition.

In an event commemorating Typhoon Haiyan in Tacloban on November 7, 2015, Martin Romualdez, the nephew of Imelda Marcos, declared his support for Jejomar Binay. On November 14, 2015, in an interview by ABS-CBN News Channel, Karen Davila asked Alma Moreno with questions regarding the Reproductive Health Law. The interview went viral when Moreno was unable to answer coherently. In November 2015, Princess Jacel Kiram and Malaysian politician Nurul Izzah Anwar posted a photo demanding Malaysian Prime Minister Najib Razak to free opposition leader Anwar Ibrahim which was received negatively in that country, prompting Nurul Izzah to apologize.
 On November 17, 2015, in a vote of 5–4, the Senate Electoral Tribunal denied the petition filed by aspiring 2016 presidential candidate Rizalito David for the disqualification of Grace Poe as a senator.

On December 14, 2015, the court rejected Jovito Palparan's bid to be released on bail despite his plea that he is running for Senate. On January 26, 2016, the Senate Blue Ribbon subcommittee concluded its hearings on the corruption allegations against Vice President and UNA presidential candidate Jejomar Binay.

Campaigning for the Senate elections began on February 9, 2016. The United Nationalist Alliance's campaign started with a proclamation rally held in Mandaluyong on that same day. The 10-person senatorial line-up of Miriam Defensor Santiago's campaign were unveiled during a campaign event at the Ynares Sports Arena on February 14, 2016. On February 15, 2016, PDP–Laban, the party of Rodrigo Duterte announced that it would not have a senatorial slate so that the party can concentrate on promoting the candidate.

On February 15, 2016, UNA senatorial candidate Manny Pacquiao, in a video statement posted by TV5 for its Bilang Pilipino coverage, made a comment on the issue of same-sex marriage. He described people in these marriages as "mas masahol pa sa hayop" (English Translation: behaving worse than animals.) Pacquiao later apologized and stated that as a Born Again Christian, he is against same-sex marriage, based on Biblical teachings but he did not condemn gay people. Nike ended their longtime partnership with Pacquiao stating that his comments against gay people were abhorrent. Bello filed a petition that may disqualify Pacquiao for violating election rules regarding publicity.
 Based on the commission's rules, Pacquiao's wife, Jinkee Pacquiao, may substitute.

On February 22, 2016, Richard J. Gordon filed a petition to the Supreme Court to reverse a decision by the Comelec from refraining to print receipts from the voting machines. Greco Belgica followed suit.

Candidates

A total of 50 candidates were included in the initial list of candidates to be included in the ballot.

*Guest candidates

Opinion polling

Opinion polling, locally known as surveys in the Philippines, is conducted by Social Weather Stations (SWS), Pulse Asia and other pollsters.

The frontrunner is in bold. Those which are within the margin of error are in italics.

Per candidate
This list includes all individuals named by at least 10% of respondents in any of the eight conducted surveys. The top 16 candidates with the highest favourability in each poll are listed below, where the top 12 is marked with a "black line". For a comprehensive list of all individuals included in the surveys, and other surveys that have been conducted before 2016, see the main article.

Results
The Commission on Elections, sitting as the National Board of Canvassers, convened for the first time on May 11, receiving the first batch of certificates of canvass, totaling 40, from various cities and diplomatic outposts. The camp of Francis Tolentino, the 13th-placed candidate, citing the alteration by Smartmatic to the script at the commission's "Transparency server", objected to the impending proclamation of the winning senators by securing a restraining order at the Supreme Court, but failed. On May 31, the SC has dismissed Tolentino's petition for being "moot and academic".

The commission proclaimed the 12 winning candidates on May 19 The senators elect include 3 senators-elect who were reelected, 4 returning senators from previous Congresses, and 5 neophytes. Seven candidates from Koalisyon ng Daang Matuwid won, four from Partido Galing at Puso, and one from the United Nationalist Alliance.

The three senators who successfully defended their seats were Franklin Drilon, Ralph Recto and Tito Sotto.

There were four senators who returned to the Senate. These were Dick Gordon, Panfilo Lacson, Francis Pangilinan, and Migz Zubiri.

Five senators entered the chamber for the first time. These were Leila de Lima, Win Gatchalian, Risa Hontiveros, Manny Pacquiao and Joel Villanueva. De Lima won her first election; this was the first election of Villanueva with his name on the ballot instead of his party (him being a nominee of the Citizens' Battle Against Corruption in party-list elections); this was the first senatorial election for both Gatchalian and Pacquiao; and this was the third attempt of Hontiveros.

Incumbents Sergio Osmeña III and TG Guingona did not successfully defend their seats.

Composition of the Senate before and after the election:
Key:
 ‡ Seats up
 + Gained by a party from another party
 √ Held by the incumbent
 * Held by the same party with a new senator

Notes:
 Alan Peter Cayetano, Bongbong Marcos and Antonio Trillanes, who all ran for the vice presidency as independents, are shown as members of the Nacionalista Party both before and after the election.
 Manny Pacquiao ran under the United Nationalist Alliance during the election, but switched to PDP–Laban before the 17th Congress convened. He is shown here as a member of the PDP–Laban in the results tables, except for the "Per candidate" table, and on the "Per party" table's "Wins" column, where he is shown as an UNA member. In all other tables, including the "Per party" table's "Start" column, he is a PDP–Laban member.

Per candidate

Per coalition
The seats won totals does not account for guest candidates.

Per party
Manny Pacquiao won the election as a candidate of United Nationalist Alliance (UNA), but later joined the PDP–Laban before the start of the 17th Congress. Pacquiao is treated as an UNA candidate in this table, except in the "After" column" where he is included in PDP–Laban's totals.

Election for the Senate President
On July 25, the day of convening of the 17th Congress, Tito Sotto and Juan Miguel Zubiri nominated Koko Pimentel for the Senate presidency, while Francis Escudero and Antonio Trillanes nominated Ralph Recto. Pimentel won by a vote of 20-3 with the backing of the largest party in the chamber, the Liberal Party, which included Recto as part of the tradition of opposing candidates voting for one other. Alan Peter Cayetano, who has expressed interest in leading the Senate, was absent during the session. Recto automatically became the Minority Leader after losing to Pimentel. Franklin Drilon was elected Senate President pro tempore while Sotto was elected Majority Leader.

References

2016
Senate